National Treasure is a four-part 2016 British television drama by Channel 4, written by Jack Thorne. It stars Robbie Coltrane as Paul Finchley, a once successful comedian of the 1980s and early 1990s, now hosting a television quiz show. He is accused of raping several young women in the early 1990s. Julie Walters plays his wife Marie and Andrea Riseborough plays his daughter Dee.

The drama is inspired by Operation Yewtree, a police operation that resulted in the prosecution of a number of veteran TV performers.

Cast
 Robbie Coltrane as Paul Finchley
 Trystan Gravelle as Young Paul
 Julie Walters as Marie Finchley, Finchley's wife
 Lucy Speed as Young Marie
 Andrea Riseborough as Danielle "Dee" Finchley, Finchley's daughter
 Cara Barton as Young Dee
 Tim McInnerny as Sir Karl Jenkins, Finchley's former comedy partner, now a major star
 Ed Eales White as Young Karl
 Babou Ceesay as Jerome Sharpe, Finchley's solicitor
 Mark Lewis Jones as Gerry, investigator
 Nadine Marshall as DI Palmer
 Kate Hardie as Rebecca Thornton, alleged rape victim
 Sarah Middleton as Young Rebecca
 Susan Lynch as Christina Farnborough, former babysitter
 Ruby Ashbourne Serkis as Young Christina
 Graeme Hawley as Dan
 William Wright-Neblett as Billy, Dee's son
 Kerry Fox as Zoe Darwin, Finchley's barrister
 Renaee-Mya Warden as Frances
 Jeremy Swift as Simon
 Rosalind Eleazar as Georgina, a prostitute
 Vivienne Bell as Stella
 David Fleeshman as Judge
 Sam Hoare as Tom
 Ben Lloyd-Hughes as Freddie
 Ronnie Fox as Taxi Driver
 Vicki Hackett as Receptionist
 Ian Puleston-Davies as Leo
 Johann Myers as Dave
 Catherine Breeze as Nurse
 Darren Boyd as Hamish
 Lee Mack as Himself
 Robert Webb as Himself
 Alan Carr as Himself
 Frank Skinner as Himself
 Victoria Derbyshire as Herself

Plot

Reception
National Treasure received universal acclaim from critics, with a Metacritic rating of 81 out of 100 based on 21 reviews.

References

External links 
 Channel 4 announcement
 
 

2010s British drama television series
2016 British television series debuts
2016 British television series endings
Channel 4 television dramas
English-language television shows
Operation Yewtree
Peabody Award-winning television programs
Rape in fiction
2010s British television miniseries
Television shows set in Yorkshire